Shalekeh (also Romanized as Shālekeh) is a village in Shanderman Rural District, Shanderman District, Masal County, Gilan Province, Iran. Its population was 405 with 94 families according to the 2006 census.

References 

Populated places in Masal County